The Tour des Pyrénées was a French road bicycle race. It was part of the French Road Cycling Cup.

Winners

References

Cycle races in France
1997 establishments in France
1998 disestablishments in France
Recurring sporting events established in 1997
Defunct cycling races in France